Hydriomena marinata is a species of moth in the family Geometridae first described by William Barnes and James Halliday McDunnough in 1917. It is found in North America.

The MONA or Hodges number for Hydriomena marinata is 7231.

Subspecies
Two subspecies belong to Hydriomena marinata:
 Hydriomena marinata exasperata Barnes & McDunnough, 1917 c g
 Hydriomena marinata marinata g
Data sources: i = ITIS, c = Catalogue of Life, g = GBIF, b = BugGuide

References

Further reading

External links

 

Hydriomena
Articles created by Qbugbot
Moths described in 1917